Jipijapa Canton is a canton of Ecuador, located in the Manabí Province.  Its capital is the town of Jipijapa.  Its population at the 2001 census was 65,796.

Demographics
Ethnic groups as of the Ecuadorian census of 2010:
Mestizo 73.5%
Montubio  18.6%
Afro-Ecuadorian  5.2%
White  2.4%
Indigenous  0.1%
Other  0.2%

References

Cantons of Manabí Province